The 1950 National Games of India were held in Bombay. They were the 14th national games, and the second time the games had been held in Bombay.

Background 

In late 1949, the Bengal Provincial Olympic Association, whose turn it was to hold the next national games, could not do so, and, at the Indian Olympic Association meeting on 24 October 1949, members from other associations were asked to stage these games but no province took the responsibility. The IOA President Maharaja of Patiala then asked Bombay to host the games; it agreed and had just three months to organise the event.

Organising Challenges 

The Bombay Provincial Olympic Association tackled many challenges as it organised for the games. First, it approached the Bombay Government for assistance, and then Bombay Home and Revenue Minister Morarji Desai presided over the first Organizing Committee meeting for the games.  Second, it sought housing for about 700 sportspersons; Major General Brar and Brigadier Madhavsinhji assisted in this effort of putting up the Olympic Village in the Barracks close to the Stadium.  Third, the CCI authorities and Homi Contractor readily acceded to the request to hold the games at Brabourne Stadium. Fourth, the question of feeding the athletes arose, and Controller of Rationing Quereshi assisted with this effort. Fifth, orders for the latest international sporting equipment had to be placed, and Secretary of the Bombay Provincial Olympic Association Sohrab Bhoot handled this task.

Organisation 

And so the National Games were held on 4–13 February 1950 in Bombay.  Key administrators for these Games were Organising Council Chair Morarji Desai; Organising Committee Chair A. S. deMello (then President of the Bombay Provincial Olympic Association); and Organising Committee Secretary Sohrab Bhoot (then Secretary of the Bombay Provincial Olympic Association).

The organising committee included 3 representatives of the Indian Olympic Association Council, as well as the Executive Committee of the Bombay Provincial Olympic Association.** 
Also assisting with organisation were members of the Reception committee, Meher and Golwalla; Stadium committee, Bebbington and Taraporewala; Village committee, Davies, Saugar, and Wadia; Grounds committee, Rane and Pardiwala; Publicity committee, Mody and Saugar; Finance committee, Mehta and Kapadia; Transport committee, Shenoy and Kate; Program committee, Joseph and Gole; and Games committee, Mhaskar and Gole.

The brochure for the Games thus noted: "True to Bombay tradition we had the help and cooperation from one and all whom we approached in the cause of Sports." And A.S. DeMello noted on 10 February at Brabourne Stadium: "In staging these games, we have received the powerful help and influence of the Government of Bombay, of friends and of many friendly experts, all of whose invaluable aid it is my privilege to acknowledge gratefully today."

**The principal officers and executive committee members of the Bombay Provincial Olympic Association were: 
1949-50: President A S deMello; Vice Presidents K G Lohana and P R Bhatt; Treasurer J Kapadia; Secretaries S Bhoot, L R Agaskar, A R M Sidiki; Members T Adams, W Abraham, K F Golwala, Y A Gole, N D Kate, B M Mistry, J T Martin, N S Saugar, V H A Sonawalla, D B Taraporewala, K Ziaudin 
1948-49: President A S deMello; Vice Presidents K G Lohana and J S Bharucha; Treasurer P R Bhatt; Secretary S Bhoot; Members D Abraham, W Abraham, L Agaskar, K F Golwala, Y A Gole, M D Kale, J T Martin, N V Sarma, N S Saugar, V H A Sonawalla, D B Taraporewala 
1947-48: President A S deMello; Vice Presidents K G Lohana and S Setna; Treasurer P R Bhatt; Secretary S Bhoot, J Pardiwala; Members W Abraham, T Adams, L Agaskar, M K Choksi, K F Golwala, N M Limaye, M B Maneckji, J T Martin, R G Nair, N V Sarma, Valimahommed H A Sonawalla

Pictures of Games

References 

Brochure, XIV Indian Olympic Games, Bombay 1950
Bombay Provincial Olympic Association Annual Report

1950 in India
Sports competitions in Mumbai
National Games of India